LeRoy Township is one of nine townships in Boone County, Illinois, USA.  As of the 2020 census, its population was 485 and it contained 201 housing units.

Geography 

Unincorporated towns
 Blaine

Cemeteries
The township contains these five cemeteries: Blaine, Burr Oak, Dullam, Stone School and Round Prairie.

Airports and landing strips
 Munch Heliport
 Pine Hill Airport

Demographics
As of the 2020 census there were 485 people, 175 households, and 126 families residing in the township. The racial makeup of the township was 89.48% White, 0.41% African American, 0.62% Native American, 0.41% Asian, 0.00% Pacific Islander, 4.95% from other races, and 4.12% from two or more races. Hispanic or Latino of any race were 7.84% of the population.

There were 175 households, out of which 15.40% had children under the age of 18 living with them, 68.00% were married couples living together, 4.00% had a female householder with no spouse present, and 28.00% were non-families. 17.70% of all households were made up of individuals, and 5.10% had someone living alone who was 65 years of age or older. The average household size was 2.65 and the average family size was 2.98.

The township's age distribution consisted of 7.5% under the age of 18, 17.9% from 18 to 24, 7.5% from 25 to 44, 52.3% from 45 to 64, and 14.7% who were 65 years of age or older. The median age was 51.9 years. For every 100 females, there were 123.1 males. For every 100 females age 18 and over, there were 116.7 males.

The median income for a household in the township was $70,089, and the median income for a family was $59,167. Males had a median income of $39,519 versus $18,958 for females. The per capita income for the township was $36,592. No families and 4.5% of the population were below the poverty line, including 28.6% of those under age 18 and none of those age 65 or over.

School districts
 Harvard Community Unit School District 50
 North Boone Community Unit School District 200

Political districts
 Illinois's 16th congressional district
 State House District 69
 State Senate District 35

References
 
 United States Census Bureau 2007 TIGER/Line Shapefiles
 United States National Atlas

External links
 City-Data.com
 Illinois State Archives

Townships in Boone County, Illinois
Populated places established in 1849
Townships in Illinois
1849 establishments in Illinois